The Second Church in Boston (also known as the Ruggles Baptist Church) is a historic church building at 874 Beacon Street in Boston, Massachusetts. It was built in 1914 in Colonial Revival style to designs by the firm of architect Ralph Adams Cram.

History
The Second Church, Boston congregation was founded in 1649, as the second Congregational church in Boston. Later the congregation adopted a Unitarian theology. After moving to several meeting houses, the congregation constructed the Beacon Street building in 1914. In 1970 the Second Church congregation merged with First Church in Boston, and the Ruggles Baptist Church, an American Baptist Churches USA congregation, acquired the Beacon Street building. The church building was added to the National Register of Historic Places on June 24, 2010.

See also
National Register of Historic Places listings in southern Boston, Massachusetts

References

External links

Baptist churches in Boston
Churches on the National Register of Historic Places in Massachusetts
Colonial Revival architecture in Massachusetts
Churches completed in 1914
Fenway–Kenmore
National Register of Historic Places in Boston